Dzirciems is a Riga neighbourhood located in the Pārdaugava side of Riga. It mainly consists of Soviet-style apartment buildings built in the 1970s. Riga Stradiņš University is located here.

Neighbourhoods in Riga